Yevgeny Vaganovich Petrosyan (born 16 September 1945) is a Soviet/Russian comedian of Armenian and Jewish descents. In 2005 he was named among the most influential figures in contemporary Russia, in a survey conducted by independent polling agency The Levada Centre. A popular comedian since the days of the Soviet Union, Petrosyan was the host of TV variety show Crooked Mirror. In January 2023, Ukraine imposed sanctions on Yevgeny for his support of 2022 Russian invasion of Ukraine.

Personal life

Yevgeny was married to actress and humorist Yelena Stepanenko (born 1953). Their engagement was in 1985. On August 3, 2018, the Russian mass media announced that Yevgeny and Yelena are getting divorced. They had made 1.5 billion rubles together while married and that money will now be divided among the two by the court of law.

Controversy  
During a New Year celebration 2023, Petrosyan openly supported the Russian invasion of Ukraine. He claimed that the "West tried to destroy Russia", exclaimed that "the one thing you can't cook Ukrainian borscht, French onion soup or German bratwurst without? Without Russian Gas!" and declared "Like it or not, Russia is enlarging."

References

External links
Yevgeny Petrosyan at the Forbes

1945 births
Russian humorists
Living people
Entertainers from Baku
Honored Artists of the RSFSR
People's Artists of the RSFSR
Recipients of the Order of Honour (Russia)
Russian male comedians
Armenian comedians
Russian satirists
Armenian satirists
Russian television presenters
Soviet television presenters
Armenian television presenters
Russian male television actors
Soviet male television actors
Armenian male television actors
Russian people of Armenian descent
Russian people of Jewish descent
Russian humour